"Jenny" is a song by American power pop band the Click Five. It was released in August 2007 as the first single from their second studio album Modern Minds and Pastimes. The song was written by Ben Romans with Jez Ashurst of UK band Farrah and Chris Braide. The original demo was sung by Chris Braide.

Background
In an interview with Songfacts, Romans stated about the origin of the song's title: "'Jenny' is just a name. A name that scans well in songs," adding: "A lot of people are like, 'Okay, who's Jenny?' It's more a representation of anyone being fickle." There have been several rumors suggesting that the song is referencing a possible friendship between the band and South Korean singer Park Bom whose English name is Jenny due to them both attending the Berklee College of Music together. In 2016, the band's former lead vocalist Kyle Patrick said in response to the rumors circulating the song on Twitter: "We may never know the truth."

Track listing
"Jenny" – 3:23

Chart performance
While failing to attract commercial success in their native United States, the song became extremely successful in Asia, doing well in Asian countries such as Singapore, Malaysia, and the Philippines. It was also performed by the band on their tour of the continent. This song is featured on DANCE! Online, a multiplayer online casual rhythm game.

References

External links
Official website of the Click Five

2007 singles
2007 songs
The Click Five songs
Lava Records singles
Songs written by Ben Romans
Songs written by Chris Braide
Songs written by Jez Ashurst